Vedat Bora (born 27 January 1995) is a Turkish professional footballer who plays as a midfielder for Karacabey Belediyespor.

References

External links

1995 births
People from Gebze
Living people
Turkish footballers
Turkey youth international footballers
Turkey under-21 international footballers
Association football midfielders
Gebzespor footballers
Konyaspor footballers
1922 Konyaspor footballers
Giresunspor footballers
Samsunspor footballers
Adana Demirspor footballers
Tuzlaspor players
Şanlıurfaspor footballers
Karacabey Belediyespor footballers
Süper Lig players
TFF First League players
TFF Second League players
TFF Third League players